The 2016 Vuelta a Asturias was the 59th edition of the Vuelta a Asturias cycling stage race. The race included three stages: it started on 30 April with a stage from Oviedo to Alto del Acebo (Cangas del Narcea) and finished on 2 May with a stage that started in Bueño and then finished back in Oviedo. The defending champion was Igor Antón.

The race was won by Hugh Carthy, who won a solo victory on the first stage and then finished in the third position on the last stage to secure victory by 22 seconds.

Teams 
A total of 14 teams and one national combined team raced in the 2016 Vuelta a Asturias: one UCI World Team, another UCI Professional Continental team and 12 UCI Continental teams.

Schedule 

The race included three road stages on consecutive days.

Stages

Stage 1 

30 April – Oviedo to Alto del Acebo,

Stage 2 

1 May – Cangas del Narcea to Pola de Lena,

Stage 3 

2 May – Bueño to Oviedo,

Classifications 

The race included four principal classifications, the leaders of which wore jerseys. The leader in the general classification wore a blue jersey; the leader in the points classification wore a blue jersey; the leader in the mountains classification wore a green jersey; the leader of the intermediate sprints classification wore a black and white jersey.

References

External links 

 Official website

Vuelta Asturias
Asturias, Vuelta a
Asturias, Vuelta a